Susarion (Greek: Σουσαρίων) was an Archaic Greek comic poet, was a native of Tripodiscus in Megaris (see Megara) and is considered one of the originators of metrical comedy and, by others, he was considered the founder of Attic Comedy. Nothing of his work, however, survives except one iambic fragment (see below) and this is not from a comedy but instead seems to belong within the Iambus tradition.

About 580 BC, he transplanted the Megarian comedy (if the rude extempore jests and buffoonery deserve the name) into the Attic deme of Icaria, the cradle also of Greek tragedy and the oldest seat of the worship of Dionysus. According to the Parian Chronicle, there appears to have been a competition on this occasion, in which the prize was a basket of figs and an amphora of wine.

Susarion's improvements in his native farces did not include a separate actor or a regular plot, but probably consisted in substituting metrical compositions for the old extempore effusions of the chorus. These were intended for recitation, and not committed to writing. But such performances did not suit the taste of the Athenians, and nothing more is heard of them until eighty years after the time of Susarion.

Ulrich von Wilamowitz-Moellendorff (in Hermes, ix) considers the so-called Megarian comedy to have been an invention of the Athenians themselves, intended as a satire on Megarian coarseness and vulgarity. The lines attributed to Susarion (in Johann Albrecht Friedrich August Meineke's Poetarum comicorum graecorum fragmenta) are probably not genuine.

Fragment
The following quote, recorded partly by Stobaeus and partly by Tzetzes, is reconstructed here to form the only extant fragment of Susarion's work:

Notes

References

Ancient Greek dramatists and playwrights
Ancient Megarians
People from Attica
6th-century BC Greek people
Old Comic poets
Iambic poets
Immigrants to Archaic Athens
Year of birth unknown
Year of death unknown